John de Bridport was the  Archdeacon of Totnes during 1207.

References

Archdeacons of Totnes